Lonchoptera bifurcata is a species of spear-winged or pointed-winged flies in the family Lonchopteridae. It has a Holarctic distribution and is present in Europe, Asia and North America.

Description
An adult Lonchoptera bifurcata is about 2-5mm (0.08-0.2in) long. In North America it can be distinguished from closely related species by having pale-coloured bristles behind the eyes, several bristles on the front of the tibiae of the first pair of legs (other species have a single bristle), and wings with fairly sharp points. There are two colour phases, light tan and black. Dark phase individuals may have a completely dark abdomen or may have pale longitudinal markings on the abdomen.

Habitat
Adults of Lonchoptera bifurcata are typically found around damp lawns and in ditches, while the larvae develop in decaying organic matter.

Biology
In North America, males of this species are very seldom seen, and the females produce young by parthenogenesis. This seems also to be the case in other parts of the insect's distribution.

References

Lonchopteridae
Muscomorph flies of Europe
Diptera of Asia
Diptera of North America
Insects described in 1810
Taxa named by Carl Fredrik Fallén